Kenneth Ken'ichi Tanaka (born 1947), also known as Kenshin Tanaka  or Ken'ichi Tanaka is a scholar, author, translator and ordained Jōdo Shinshū priest. 
He is author and editor of many articles and books on modern Buddhism.

Biography
Tanaka was born in 1947 in Japan but grew up in Mountain View, California.
He received his B.A in Anthropology from Stanford University in 1970. He then received his masters in Philosophy and Indian Studies and his Ph.D. through the Graduate School of Humanities Doctoral Program in Buddhist Studies  at the University of California, Berkeley. 
In 1991 Tanaka was appointed the Rev. Yoshitaka Tamai Professor at the Institute of Buddhist Studies, an affiliate of the Graduate Theological Union at Berkeley, California. He was president of the Buddhist Council of Northern California and served as editor of Pacific World: The Journal of the Institute of Buddhist Studies.
In 1995 he became the pastor of the Southern Alameda County Buddhist Church.

Tanaka is the author of numerous articles and books on the subject of Buddhism.  He was interviewed as part of the PBS report Tensions in American Buddhism in 2001 and Talk of the Nation program of National Public Radio. 
In 1998 he became professor of Buddhist Studies at Musashino University in Tokyo, Japan. He produced and appeared in a television series sponsored by the Bukkyo Dendo Kyokai foundation that aired in 2005, with DVDs later distributed.
He gave the keynote address at the 750th memorial observance of Shinran in February 2010.

Works
  SUNY series in Buddhist studies
 
 
 
  Preface: "Responsibility" and Chapter 17: "Ethics in American Jōdo-Shinshū: Trans Ethical Responsibility"
  Volume 17 of Studies in East Asian Buddhism
  Issue 8 of Faculty of philosophy, Dharma Endowment Lectures
 
The Eastern Buddhist New Series Vol. XXXVII (The Eastern Buddhist Society, 2005)
  Volume 58 of Buddhist traditions

References

External links
American Buddhism's Racial Divide
Kenneth Tanaka's Professional Website

Living people
Japanese emigrants to the United States
American writers of Japanese descent
Japanese Buddhists
American Buddhists
Pure Land Buddhism
Buddhist writers
Buddhist translators
American Buddhist studies scholars
Japanese scholars of Buddhism
University of California, Berkeley alumni
1947 births
Jōdo Shinshū Buddhist priests